Alex Wright is an American writer and Information Architect.  He is the author of two books: Cataloging the World: Paul Otlet and the Birth of the Information Age (2014) and Glut: Mastering Information Through the Ages (2007).  Wright is also a professor at the School of Visual Arts in New York City and head of User Experience research at Etsy. Many of his writings examine the current state of information transmission and organization through a historical, scientific, or cultural context.

Biography
Wright grew up in Richmond, Virginia and Sussex, England.  In high school, he has been described as "A long-haired nerd who spent lots of time in the computer lab but somehow never managed to get much past Basic." He has a B.A. in English Literature from Brown University and a graduate degree in Library and Information Science from Simmons College.  Throughout his career, he has been a frequent contributor to The New York Times.  Wright currently resides in Brooklyn, New York with his wife and two sons.

Bibliography

References

External links
 

Living people
Information architects
American non-fiction writers
Year of birth missing (living people)
Writers from Richmond, Virginia
School of Visual Arts faculty
Brown University alumni